New Basket Brindisi, for sponsorship reasons named Happy Casa Brindisi or shortly Brindisi, is a professional Italian basketball based in Brindisi, Apulia. It plays in the first division LBA in the 2022–23 season.

Founded in 2004, the well-supported club (who regularly sells out its arena – albeit one of the smallest ones in the league – and sent three thousand fans to Rome for a game) has gradually grown to reach in turn the Serie A, the title playoffs, the EuroChallenge and lastly the BCL.

History
Brindisi had in the past been represented by Libertas Brindisi, which played during the '70 and the season 1981–82 in the first division and spent nine others in the second division around the same period (including a few with local great Elio Pentassuglia as coach).
That side would fold in 1987 whilst another local side, Azzurra Brindisi, played a few seasons in the third division during the 1990s before itself disappearing in 2001.
The city was left without a representative in the national divisions, in the meantime, New Basket Ceglie – based in nearby Ceglie Messapica since its 1992 foundation – had been promoted to the fourth division Serie B but was hampered by the lack of a suitable arena in the town (the local Palazzetto dello sport only seating 500).  
Ceglie then moved to Brindisi's PalaPentassuglia arena that same summer, however the team didn't draw the local public and was sold to Giovanni Di Bella at the end of the season, with the new owner making the move to the city permanent.
Also in 2002, Massimo Ferrarese started sponsoring the club under his company's Prefabbricati Pugliesi brand, two years he would buy out Di Bella (who was planning on selling the club to a team in another city) to become the sole owner of the club and form New Basket Brindisi in the process, with Antonio Codiano as its president.

On the court, Brindisi won the Serie B2 regular season and reached the promotion playoffs final as favourites, however they lost the series against Ribera after being beaten 71–104 in the decisive game on 25 May 2005.
They were admitted to the Serie B1 in all cases, finishing the 2005–06 season fifth.
The next season saw a team led by Uruguayan Alejandro Muro win the regular season but lose in the playoff quarterfinals to Veroli.
The promotion goal would finally be attained on 8 June 2008 as Brindisi beat Trapani to reach the championship final (that they would lose to Venezia) and earn a promotion to the LegaDue.

After a transitional season, Brindisi, coached by promotion specialist Giovanni Perdichizzi, won the 2009–10 LegaDue regular season to move up to the first division Serie A.
The team did not manage to stay in the elite as they were relegated at the end of a season that saw a lot of roster changes, including Perdichizzi's replacement by Luca Bechi.
The offseason saw organisational changes as Ferrarese ceded most of his shares to a newly formed group of twelve local businessmen, staying as honorary president (a post he left in 2014 following disagreements with new owner Fernando Marino).
Bucchi then led the team to a successful season as they lost only one game during the promotion playoffs, beating Pistoia in the decisive finals game 4 on 14 June 2012 to return to the Serie A.
The team had earlier won the LegaDue Cup by beating Fileni BPA Jesi 77-74 in the final.

Its second season in the elite proved better than the first as Brindisi, led by Jonathan Gibson and Jeff Viggiano, qualified for the mid-season Italian Cup final eight and seemed a sure bet for the playoffs before losing ten of its last eleven regular season games to finish twelfth, a position that comfortably guaranteed its Serie A place.
The 2013–14 season proved even better, the club finished the first stage of the season in first place (tied on 22 points with Cantù but above on head-to-head record) to again qualify for the Italian Cup.  
Brindisi reached the Italian Cup semifinals before losing to EA7 Emporio Armani Milan, while its fifth-place finish in the league (conceding the fourth place to Dinamo Banco di Sardegna Sassari when defeated by the side in the final regular season game) qualified it for the playoffs. 
Though they were swept 3-0 by Sassari it was still a record-breaking season to celebrate for the fans.
The 2014–15 season saw the Italian side make its European debut in the third tier EuroChallenge, going all the way to the quarterfinals before getting knocked out by Nanterre. 
A sixth-place finish in the league saw the Apulians again take part in the playoffs, in which they earned their first ever victory during the quarterfinal series against Grissin Bon Reggion Emilia, leading the tie 2–1 before wasting two chances to go through.

Brindisi received a wild card to be admitted to the European second-tier 2015–16 Eurocup.

Arena
The Palazzetto Nuova Idea (capacity: 2,302) was built in September 1980 and completed only hours before then tenant Pallacanestro Brindisi's (a renamed Libertas) first game of the season.
New Basket Ceglie moved into the arena in 2001, starting New Basket Brindisi's tenure (starting from them taking over Ceglie in 2004).
Nuova Idea, named after the private company that built and owned it, was renamed PalaPentassuglia (in full:Palazzetto dello Sport "Elio Pentassuglia") in honour of Brindisi stalwart Elio Pentassuglia (deceased in a 1988 car crash) after it came under possession of the municipality sometime later, it is sometimes colloquially referred to as PalaElio.

The venue was not up to the standards of the Serie A when Brindisi entered the league in 2010, as the long projected construction of a new arena had not borne any fruits the PalaPentassuglia's capacity was increased to just over the 3,500 requirement (3,534) amidst a general refurbishment.
After the new arena project was finally abandoned in 2014, the municipal authorities announced a new renovation plan for the PalaPentassuglia in October of that year, that would take its capacity to around 6,000 seats whilst modernising the structure, with the work expected to be delivered prior to the 2015–16 season. 
However, the project soon ran into bureaucratic quagmires and work did not start in earnest until September 2015, where the lighting was updated to answer Eurocup's requirements, the rest of the refurbishment work is now expected to be started in March 2016.
The refurbishment didn't give to the arena more seating. However, a new plan to build a brand new Arena were presented in 2018 and, after several levels of bureaucratic authorization, the municipality authorities, thanks to private investors and government funding, announced that the New Arena received all the necessary authorization to finally be built. 
The new project has been revealed to the public and the tender for the construction has been assigned. The New Arena will be finalised by 2023 and will have 6500 seating and the possibility to host more events and sports, being an opportunity for the City of Brindisi to increment their tourism and revenue.

Players

Current roster

Season by season

Honours

Domestic competitions
LegaDue
Champions (1): 2010
LegaDue Cup
Winners (1): 2012
 Italian Cup
 Runners-up (2): 2019 2020

Other competitions
Brindisi, Italy Invitational Game
Winners (1): 2014
Trofeo Memorial Elio Pentassuglia
Winners (1): 2018

Notable players 

2010s
  Nic Moore 1 season: '16–'17
  Samardo Samuels 1 season: '17–'present
  Amath M'Baye 1 season: '16–'present
  Andrea Zerini 4 seasons: '11–'present
  Massimo Bulleri 2 seasons: '13–'15
  Delroy James 2 seasons: '13–'15
  Jerome Dyson 1 season: '13–'14
  Jonathan Gibson 1 season: '12–'13
  Yakhouba Diawara 1 season: '10–'11
  Bobby Dixon 1 season: '10–'11
 Robert Carter

2000s
  Nikola Radulovic 2 seasons: '09–'10, '10–'11
  Joe Crispin 1 season: '09–'10
  Omar Thomas 1 season: '09–'10

Notable coaches 
 Massimo Bianchi 1 seasons: '04–'05
 Giovanni Perdichizzi 2 seasons: '08–'10
 Piero Bucchi 4 seasons: '11–'16
 Romeo Sacchetti 1 season: '16–'17

Logos

Sponsorship names
Throughout the years, due to sponsorship, the club has been known as:
Prefabbricati Pugliesi Brindisi (2004–2008)
Enel Brindisi (2008–2017)
Happy Casa Brindisi (2018–2021)

References

External links 
Serie A profile  Retrieved 31 August 2015